Amomum subulatum, also known as Black cardamom, hill cardamom, Bengal cardamom, greater cardamom, Indian cardamom, Nepal cardamom, winged cardamom, big cardamon, or brown cardamom, is a perennial herbaceous plant in the family Zingiberaceae. Its seed pods have a strong, camphor-like flavour, with a smoky character derived from the method of drying. In Hindi it is called  (baḍī ilāicī).

Characteristics
The pods are used as a spice, in a similar manner to the green Indian cardamom pods, but with a different flavour. Unlike green cardamom, this spice is rarely used in sweet dishes. Its smoky flavour and aroma derive from traditional methods of drying over open flames.

Species
At least two distinct species of black cardamom occur: Amomum subulatum (also known as Nepal cardamom) and Amomum tsao-ko. The pods of A. subulatum, used primarily in the cuisines of India and certain regional cuisines of Pakistan, are the smaller of the two, while the larger pods of A.  tsao-ko (Chinese: wiktionary:草果; pinyin: cǎoguǒ; Vietnamese: thảo quả) are used in Vietnamese cuisine and Chinese cuisine, particularly that of Sichuan province.

Agricultural production
The largest producer of the black cardamom is Nepal, followed by India and Bhutan.

Medical use
In traditional Chinese medicine, black cardamom is used for stomach disorders and malaria. In the traditional medicine of India, decoction of Amomum subulatum rhizomes is used in the therapy of jaundice.

See also
Cardamom
Lanxangia tsaoko
Aframomum corrorima

References

Amomum
Spices
Plants used in traditional Chinese medicine
Indian spices